Lycée Descartes (formerly known as Lycée Gouraud) is a French international school in Rabat, Morocco.

The establishment is managed by the AEFE, an agency under the administration of the French Ministry of Foreign Affairs, that assures the quality of schools teaching the French national curriculum outside France. It replaced the first French junior high establishment in Morocco, "Le Lycée Gouraud" which was built in 1919 during the French Protectorate, and later became a public high school named after the late king Hassan II.

This school, which opened its doors to students in October 1963 in the Agdal neighborhood of Rabat, is one of the largest French education institutions in Morocco. It welcomes 2 500 students, of various national origins: 48% French, 48% Moroccan and 4% other internationals, and spans middle school classes through classes préparatoires aux grandes écoles.

Known for training the elite of the country, and for promising equally good prospects to graduates in Morocco as outside of it, the Lycee consistently registers a success rate at the baccalauréat (98.9% across all majors in 2012) that is significantly higher than the national average in France (84.5% in 2012).

The Lycée Descartes produced many notable Moroccan and French politicians, scientists, executives, athletes and cultural icons. (See )

Notable alumni

References

External links
  Lycée Descartes

International schools in Rabat
French international schools in Morocco